Cleveland Glacier is a glacier about  wide which flows east-southeast from Mount Morrison and Mount Brøgger to enter Mackay Glacier just west of Mount Marston, in Victoria Land. It was discovered by the British Antarctic Expedition, 1910–13, and named by Frank Debenham, a member of the expedition, after his mother's maiden name.

References 

Glaciers of Scott Coast